The South Bird's Head or South Doberai languages are three families of Papuan languages. They form part of the Trans–New Guinea languages in the classifications of Malcolm Ross (2005) and Timothy Usher (2020), though Pawley and Hammarström (2018) do not consider them to be part of Trans–New Guinea. However, according to Dryer (2022), based on a preliminary quantitative analysis of data from the ASJP database, South Bird's Head languages are likely to be a subgroup of Trans–New Guinea.

Languages
The languages are as follows,
 Konda-Yahadian (Yabin): Konda, Yahadian
 Inanwatan (West South Bird's Head): Duriankere, Inanwatan (Suabo)
 South Bird's Head proper (East South Bird's Head):
 Kais (Kampong Baru)
 Iwaro–Kaburi
 Kaburi
 Puragi (Iwaro)
 Kokoda–Arandai
 Kokoda (Tarof, Kasuweri)
Arandai
 Kemberano (Weriagar, Barau)
 Dombano (Tomu)

Noting low cognacy rates, Holton and Klamer (2018) tentatively consider the following three language groups to each be independent language families, pending further evidence.
Konda–Yahadian
Inanwatan–Duriankere
Nuclear South Bird's Head

Usher classifies the South Bird's Head languages as part of a wider Berau Gulf branch of Trans–New Guinea.

Pronouns
The pronouns are:

{|class=wikitable
! !!sg!!pl
|-
!1ex
|rowspan=2|*na||*ni-ri, *i-ri
|-
!1in
|*na-ri, *ya-ri
|-
!2
|*a||*a-ri, *i-ri
|}

3sg *ni is reconstructable for SBH proper.  There appears to be both a plural vowel change from *a to *i, as in proto-TNG, and a plural suffix *-ri.

Cognates
Below are cognates in Nuclear South Bird's Head languages (Arandai, Kokoda, Kemberano, Kaburi, Kais, Puragi) demonstrating their relatedness, as listed by Holton & Klamer (2018):

{| 
|+ Nuclear South Bird's Head family cognates
! gloss !! Arandai !! Kokoda !! Kemberano !! Kaburi !! Kais !! Puragi
|-
| ‘eye’ || emago || mago || magu || amiagu || magu || imagu
|-
| ‘head’ || kabe || kaba || kabe || wa’ava || kabo || koibi
|-
| ‘egg’ || kuo || ukwo || oku || uko || uku || vuko
|-
| ‘one’ || onate || onasia || anate || ma’aja || onate || mo’onata
|-
| ‘two’ || ogi || ogia || oge || uge || uge || oge
|-
| ‘I’ || nendi || nedi || nedi || neri || neri || nedi
|}

South Bird's Head basic vocabulary quoted by Holton & Klamer (2018) from de Vries (2004), showing diverse non-cognate vocabulary across different language groups:

{| 
|+ South Bird's Head basic vocabulary comparison
! gloss !! Yahadian !! Inanwatan !! Kokoda !! Puragi
|-
| arm/hand || re || ewó || obora || nebɔru
|-
| leg/foot || dɛbɛ ||  || ɔtɔra || neʔɔru
|-
| house || ɔ || meʔáro || kɛnia || einɔ
|-
| good || hɔbɔre || sówato || nigeja || nai/najɔ
|-
| dog || ɟia || méwoʔo || dawɔra || rɔga
|-
| pig || mɔmɔ || bidó || tabai || βuʔi
|-
| chicken || kokoro || ádiro || koko || korau
|-
| louse || nɔ || ʔóto || kɔnɔ || kɔnɔ
|-
| water/river || hɛdɛ/mu || tó/múro || tai/tɔiria || adɔna/ɔwedi
|-
| banana || huŋgunɔn || ɸúgi(do) || udi || amimi
|}

Morphology
Except for the outlier languages Konda and Yahadian, all South Bird's Head languages have nouns classified according to masculine and feminine genders, which are determined with final vowel quality. West Bird's Head languages also mark nouns for gender.

Syntax
Unlike many other languages of the Bird's Head Peninsula which display SVO word order (such as Abun, Mpur, Maibrat, West Bird's Head, and others), the South Bird's Head languages have SOV word order.

Further reading

Cowan, H. K. J. 1953. Voorlopige Resultaten van een Ambtelijk Taalonderzoek in Nieuw-Guinea [Tentative Results of a Governmental Linguistic Study in New Guinea]. ’S-Gravenhage: Martinus Nijhoff.
Galis, Klaas Wilhelm. 1955. Talen en dialecten van Nederlands Nieuw-Guinea [Languages and dialects of Netherlands New Guinea]. Tijdschrift Nieuw-Guinea 16: 109–118, 134–145, 161–178.
Smits, Leo and Clemens L. Voorhoeve. 1998. The J.C. Anceaux Collection of Wordlists of Irian Jaya Languages B: Non-Austronesian (Papuan) languages (Part II). Leiden-Jakarta: Department of Cultures and Languages of Southeast Asia and Oceania.

References

External links
East South Bird's Head. New Guinea World.

 
Languages of Papua New Guinea
Berau Gulf languages